Eka Darville (born 11 April 1989) is an Australian actor. He is best known for his roles as Scott Truman in Power Rangers RPM, Pip in Mr. Pip, Malcolm Ducasse in Jessica Jones  and Diego in The Originals.

Biography

Early life
Darville went to Byron Bay High School and lives in Byron Bay, New South Wales, and Sydney. He enjoys skateboarding and surfing. His father is the Jamaican reggae artist Ray Darwin and his mother is Canadian.

Career

Darville is known for playing Malcolm Ducasse on the Netflix television series Jessica Jones, as well as Diego on The CW TV series The Originals and Ryan Morgan on the Fox TV series Empire. He is also known for his past roles as Adam Bridge on the Australian television drama series Blue Water High, Taylor in The Elephant Princess, Scott Truman (Red Ranger) in Power Rangers RPM and Pietros in Spartacus: Blood and Sand.

Filmography

Film

Television

References

External links 
 

1989 births
Australian people of Canadian descent
Australian people of Jamaican descent
Australian male television actors
Living people
People from the Northern Rivers